The 2016 Iowa Democratic presidential caucuses were held on Monday February 1 in Iowa, as usual marking the Democratic Party's first nominating contest in their series of presidential primaries ahead of the 2016 presidential election.

The Republican Party held its own Iowa caucuses on the same day.

Despite a late challenge, Hillary Clinton was able to defeat Bernie Sanders in the first-in-the-nation Iowa Caucus by the closest margin in the history of the contest: 49.8% to 49.6% (Clinton collected 700.47 state delegate equivalents to Sanders' 696.92, a difference of one quarter of a percentage point). The victory, which was projected to award her 23 pledged national convention delegates (two more than Sanders), made Clinton the first woman to win the Caucus and marked a clear difference from 2008, where she finished in third place behind Obama and John Edwards. Martin O'Malley suspended his campaign after a disappointing third-place finish with only 0.5% of the state delegate equivalents awarded, leaving Clinton and Sanders the only two major candidates in the race.  171,517 people participated in the 2016 Iowa Democratic caucuses.

Procedure

There was no ballot; instead, a unique form of debate and groupings chose delegates to county conventions supporting Hillary Clinton, Martin O'Malley, and Bernie Sanders. The Iowa Democratic Party did not release vote counts or the numbers of these delegates. Instead, they released the estimated amount of state delegates supporting each candidate. The county conventions selected delegates to district and state conventions, which in turn selected the delegates to the Democratic National Convention. The delegates at the county, district and state conventions were not pledged and were allowed to change their preference, meaning that the final result of the state delegates could have been different from what was estimated at the Iowa precinct caucuses.

Delegates to the 2016 Democratic National Convention were selected at district and state conventions. The First and Second congressional districts received 8 district delegates, the Third received 7 and the Fourth received 6. These district delegates were elected at the District Conventions based on the result in each Congressional District.

At the State Convention, the 15 statewide pledged delegates were elected based on the statewide results. 9 of these delegates were At-Large and 6 were Party Leaders and Elected Officials (PLEO) who were pledged based on the proportion of At-Large delegates supporting candidates.  The Iowa delegation also included 8 superdelegates who were not pledged based on the result of the caucus process, which included 1 U.S. Representative and 7 Democratic National Committee members.

Debates and forums

November 2015 debate in Des Moines

On November 14, 2015, the Democratic Party held a second presidential debate at the Sheslow Auditorium at Drake University in Des Moines, Iowa. Hosted by CBS News Political Director John Dickerson, it aired on CBS News and was also broadcast by KCCI and The Des Moines Register. With the remaining candidates Hillary Clinton, Bernie Sanders, and Martin O'Malley participating, it was the first debate to be broadcast over nationwide network television, the previous debate having gone over cable.

As the day before the debate, November 13, was the day of the November 2015 Paris attacks, CBS announced that the debate would focus on foreign policy and terrorism. In addition, a moment of silence was held at the beginning of the debate in memory of the victims.

January 2016 forum in Des Moines

On January 11, 2016 the "Black and Brown" forum was held at Drake University in Des Moines, Iowa. Focusing on minority issues, it aired on Fusion.

Opinion polling

Results

Following a poor result in the caucuses, Martin O'Malley announced he was suspending his campaign.

Controversy

"Organizational issues around the caucus", including difficulty identifying volunteers to "oversee individual precinct caucuses," contributed to a "disorganized process that lent itself to chaos and conspiracy theories" according to The Guardian.

After initially refusing to review caucus results, Iowa Democratic Party officials did end up "making updates where discrepancies have been found." With "doubts about which Democratic candidate actually won the Iowa caucuses," there have been "fresh calls for the party to mirror the simple, secret-ballot method" the Republicans use. Stated Norm Sterzenbach, former Iowa Democratic Party executive director who oversaw five election cycles: "It's worth discussing again, but it's not as simple as it sounds." It is said that Clinton won by the thinnest margin in the history of Iowa caucuses.

Instances

Iowa Democrats reported "discrepancies in caucus results" and confusion over the math of the delegate-awarding system. In Grinnell Ward 1, 19 delegates were awarded to Sanders and seven to Clinton on caucus night. The Iowa Democratic party later shifted one delegate from Sanders to Clinton, but did not notify the precinct secretary, who "only discovered that this happened the next day, when checking the precinct results in other parts of the county."

Other reported discrepancies included:
 the lone caucusgoer in Woodbury County No. 43, who voted for Sanders—but "final results state" Clinton won one county delegate and Sanders zero.
 in Knoxville No. 3, where the count was 58 for Sanders and 52 for Clinton—but official results showed Clinton with five county delegates and Sanders with four.
 the four delegates in Cedar Rapids No. 9 precinct who split evenly between Sanders and Clinton—but only 131 people signed in at the beginning of the caucus with two separate head counts showing 136 people voted.
In Des Moines No. 42, "after everyone had formed initial groups for their preferred candidate," a Clinton supporter addressed O'Malley supporters and undecideds, telling them "they could stay and realign or leave." Some mistakenly believed that meant voting was finished and left early without being counted. In the same precinct, votes were still missing the morning after the caucus. Democrats "from that neighborhood scrambled to find party officials" to report that Sanders won by a margin of two delegates over Clinton. This narrowed Clinton's "excruciatingly close lead" even further—bringing the tally for "delegate equivalents" at that point to Clinton 699.57, Sanders 697.77.

Coin tosses

The Des Moines Register reported "an unknown number" of county delegates awarded "after the flip of a coin." Sam Lau, a spokesman for the Iowa Democratic Party, said seven coin flips were reported through "the party's smartphone app"—but officials who reported county delegate totals via the app "weren't required to signify if the win was the result of a coin toss." Lau said Bernie Sanders won six of these. The paper identified "six coin flips through social media and one in an interview with a caucus participant"—with Clinton the apparent winner of six of these seven. Any overlap, or its impact on results, between the coin flips identified by the Register and those the party confirmed was not known.

An Iowa Democratic Party official told NPR there were "at least a dozen tiebreakers" decided by a coin toss— and that "Sen. Sanders won at least a handful."

Review

Sanders' campaign "launched" a review of the results of the caucuses, citing as "complicating factors" the "razor-thin margin", the "arcane" caucusing rules, the reporting delays from some precincts, and the reporting technology used. The campaign is rechecking results precinct-by-precinct, reviewing "math sheets or other paperwork" precinct chairs used and were supposed to return to party officials—then comparing these with results entered into the party's Microsoft app. Rania Batrice, a Sanders spokeswoman, challenged: "Let's compare notes. Let's see if they match."

In an editorial, The Des Moines Register called for an audit of the results, declaring "What happened Monday night at the Democratic caucuses was a debacle, period." First noting that only two-tenths of a percent separated Sanders and Clinton and "much larger margins trigger automatic recounts in other states," they stated:

Too many accounts have arisen of inconsistent counts, untrained and overwhelmed volunteers, confused voters, cramped precinct locations, a lack of voter registration forms and other problems. Too many of us, including members of the Register editorial board who were observing caucuses, saw opportunities for error amid Monday night's chaos.

In lieu of "official paper records" the party had "declined to provide the campaign"—which would show individual precinct vote tallies before they were entered into the party's app the night of the caucuses—the Sanders' campaign was contacting each of its own precinct captains to reconstruct caucus results. Sanders' campaign manager Jeff Weaver said: "I think everybody has an interest in making it as accurate as possible", though "[a]s an empirical matter, we're not likely to ever know what the actual result was".

Analysis

Despite a late challenge from insurgent Senator Bernie Sanders of Vermont, whose populist economic message resonated with Iowa's progressive Democratic electorate, Clinton eked out a 0.2-percentage-point victory in the first-in-the-nation caucus, edging out Sanders by only four state delegate equivalents. As The New York Times described, Sanders' near-tie with Clinton combined with Ted Cruz's Republican victory in the caucus demonstrated how the "2016 campaign has turned to easing the palpable frustrations of a large portion of white working-class Americans who believe that the country no longer works for them."

According to entrance polls, Clinton won the white vote by a 49–46 margin against Sanders, with white voters comprising 91% of the Iowa electorate. She won non-white voters more resoundingly, 58–34. Sanders won among men, 50–44, but Clinton won women, 53-42. Sanders proved his immense strength with millennials by winning 17–29-year-olds 84-14, with Clinton winning senior citizens, 69–26. Clinton won among voters who had a high school diploma or less, and among those who had a postgraduate degree, while Sanders won voters with only a college degree. Sanders won 53-44 among voters who made an income of less than $50k per year, Clinton won more affluent voters 52-42. In terms of political party affiliation, Clinton won Democrats 56-39 but lost Independents to Bernie Sanders, 69–29.

Upon learning she had been awarded the state of Iowa after 1 P.M. the following day, Clinton told CNN's Wolf Blitzer, "My luck was not that good last time around, and it was wonderful to win the caucus, to have that experience."

See also
 2016 Iowa Republican presidential caucuses

References

Iowa
Democratic primary
2016